Starflam is a Belgian hip hop group from Liège in the French-speaking southern part of Belgium - Wallonia. The group started out in the early 1990s under the name H-Posse with members DJ Mig One, Fred'alabas, Seg and Balo (AKA Baloji). A few years later, after Brussels-born Akro and Mista R. joined the group, the name was changed to Malfrats Linguistiques (linguistic gangsters). Mista R. later left the group when he emigrated to France, and was replaced by Kaer and Pavé, 2 rappers from Liège. The group changed names again, now to Starflam (the reverse anagram of Malfrats). They now consist of 5 rappers, a bass player and a DJ. In 2005, Balo left the group to start a solo career.

10 years after their last album together, the group made a comeback in 2015 with 2 new single : "Plus que jamais" (January 2015) and "A l'ancienne" (April 2015).

Discography 
 Corde Raide (12", Discipline Records, 1997)
 Starflam (Discipline Records / Rough Trade, 1998)
 Bled Runner (12", Warner, 2000)
 Live & Direct (Warner, 2000)
 Survivant (EMI, 2001)
 Donne Moi de l'Amour (EMI, 2003)
 Donne Moi de l'Amour : Deluxe edition (EMI, 2004)
 Faites du bruit by EMI 2005)
 L'encre, La Sueur Et le Sang (Akro Solo) 2006
 Au Crunk (Akro Solo) 2007
 Bleu électrique (Akro Solo) 2011

DVD 
 Faites du Bruit (EMI, 2005)

External links 
 Official :
 Official Website (French)
 Official forums
 Other :
 The Belgian Pop and Rock archives
 Studio where Starflam record most of their songs

Starflam
Musicians from Liège